Myroslava Petrivna Kot née Buha, (5 October 1933 – 29 December 2014) was a Ukrainian embroiderer. From 1991, she was the head of the Department of Methodology and History of Ukrainian Decorative and Applied Arts at the Teachers’ Training College in Drohobych. She was awarded Master of Folk Crafts of Ukraine in 1995, and an Honorary Citizen of Drohobych in 2012.

Myroslava Kot studied Ukrainian embroidery paying particular attention to Drohobych patterns. Her works have been exhibited in Ukraine, Canada and the United States. 19 of her students became Ukraine People’s Masters of Decorative and Applied Arts.

Selected publications

References

Further reading

1933 births
2014 deaths
20th-century Ukrainian women artists
20th-century women textile artists
20th-century textile artists
21st-century Ukrainian women artists
21st-century women textile artists
21st-century textile artists
Folk artists
Ukrainian embroiderers
Artists from Warsaw